Six Men's Bay is a fishing village located to the south of Maycock's Bay in the northwest of Barbados, north of the town of Speightstown. Just off shore of the bay, ini 60 ft of water, rests the 165 ft long wreck of a sunken freighter named Pamir (not the same as sailing vessel Pamir), a spot for scuba diving.

References

Bays of Barbados